Events from the year 1573 in Ireland.

Incumbent
Monarch: Elizabeth I

Events
February 23 – James FitzMaurice FitzGerald submits to John Perrot, Lord Deputy of Ireland, at Kilmallock.
March 25 – Gerald FitzGerald, 15th Earl of Desmond, returns to Ireland. He is detained in Dublin but escapes about 11 November.
April 14 – grant of denization to Sorley Boy MacDonnell and other settlers from Scotland.
May – Brian O'Neill of Clandeboye burns Carrickfergus.
June – a warrant is given for the restoration of his lands to Connor O'Brien, 3rd Earl of Thomond.
July 9 – Elizabeth I of England grants Walter Devereux, Earl of Essex, the right to plant most of County Antrim. He sets out with a military force (including Moyses Hill) from England to do so, but his ships are dispersed by storm.
September 29 – Essex is granted a commission of "general captainship in all Ulster". His troops encamp for the winter at Belfast while opposition is gathered by Brian O'Neill and Turlough Luineach O'Neill.
October 20 – Planter Thomas Smith the younger is shot in Ards.
October – Essex and Hugh O'Neill, Earl of Tyrone, act against Brian O'Neill.
c. October – David Wolfe, papal legate to Ireland, goes to Spain.
Walter Ball, who subsequently became Mayor of Dublin and imprisoned his mother Margaret Ball on religious grounds, becomes an Alderman of Dublin.

Births
David Rothe, Roman Catholic Bishop of Ossory

Deaths
December 27 – James Stanihurst, politician
Robert Weston, Dean of the Arches and Lord Chancellor of Ireland (b. 1515)
Approximate date – Arthur O'Friel, Roman Catholic cleric

References

1570s in Ireland
Years of the 16th century in Ireland